I Can't Be New is the sixth album by American singer-songwriter Susan Werner, released in 2004 (see 2004 in music).

Track listing
all songs written by Susan Werner, except where noted

"I Can't Be New" (Jane Paul, Werner) – 2:54
"Late for the Dance" – 3:36
"Seeing You Again" – 2:41
"I'm Not Sure" – 4:15
"Much at All" – 4:08
"Tall Drink of Water" – 3:01
"You Come Through" – 3:13
"No One Needs to Know" – 2:58
"Let's Regret This in Advance" – 2:45
"Don't I Know You" – 3:05
"Philanthropy" – 2:53
"Stay on Your Side of Town" – 2:54
"Maybe If I Sang Cole Porter (Coda)" – 1:46

Personnel
Susan Werner – piano, rhythm guitar, ukulele, vocals, background vocals, Wurlitzer, nylon string guitar
Eugene Friesen – cello
Crit Harmon – percussion, handclapping, snaps
Hatfield Five – string quartet
Brad Hatfield – piano, Hammond organ, vibraphone, Fender Rhodes
John Lockwood – upright bass
Dave Mattacks – drums
Billy Novick – clarinet, woodwind
Stephen Sadler – banjo, dobro, mandolin, ukulele, baritone ukulele
Mike Turk – chromatic harmonica

Production
Producer: Crit Harmon
Engineer: Crit Harmon, John Lupfer
Mixing: John Lupfer
Mastering: Paul Angelli
A&R: David Wilkes
Digital editing: Matt Beaudoin
Arranger: Billy Novick
Product manager: Dan O'Leary
Design: Jeff Gilligan
Caricatures: Adam Belmares

Susan Werner albums
2004 albums
Jazz-pop albums
Vocal jazz albums
Swing albums
E1 Music albums